Brown is an unincorporated community in Bryan County, Oklahoma, United States. It is located 13 miles northwest of Durant. Brown had a post office from July 3, 1913 until July 15, 1927. It was named after its first postmaster, Robert H. Brown.

References

Unincorporated communities in Bryan County, Oklahoma
Unincorporated communities in Oklahoma